The National Collection of Aerial Photography is a photographic archive in Edinburgh, Scotland, containing 26 million aerial photographs of worldwide historic events and places. From 2008–2015 it was part of the Royal Commission on the Ancient and Historical Monuments of Scotland and since then it has been a sub-brand of Historic Environment Scotland.  Many of the aerial reconnaissance photographs were taken during the Second World War and the Cold War, and were declassified and released by the Ministry of Defence. The collection also contains over 1.8 million aerial photographs of Scotland, during and in the years after the Second World War, as well as post-war Ordnance Survey, and over 10 million images of international sites as part of The Aerial Reconnaissance Archives (TARA). The collection contains both military declassified and non-military aerial photographs from over a dozen different national and international organisations.

NCAP’s historical aerial photography is primarily used to locate unexploded Second World War bombs by European bomb disposal companies and in historical, archaeological and climate change research. It is also used for documentaries and dramas on television and in film.

Collections
AIRBUS Defence & Space
Allied Central Interpretation Unit (ACIU) (from RAF Medmenham)
Defence Geographic Centre
Directorate of Overseas Surveys (DOS)
Environment Agency
German Air Force
Getmapping
Joint Air Reconnaissance Intelligence Centre (JARIC)
Mediterranean Allied Photo Reconnaissance Wing (MAPRW)
National Archives and Records Administration
Natural Environment Research Council
Scottish Office Air Photographs Unit

Bibliography
Cowley, Dave C, Crawford, James, (2009) Above Scotland: The National Collection of Aerial Photography, RCAHMS. 
Bailey, Rebecca M, Crawford, James, Williams, Allan (2010) Above Scotland Cities: The National Collection of Aerial Photography, RCAHMS. 
Crawford, James, (2012) Scotland's Landscapes: The National Collection of Aerial Photography, RCAHMS. 
Hanson, William S., Oltean, Ioana A., editors (2012) Archaeology from Historical Aerial and Satellite Archives, Springer Science & Business Media. 
Williams, Allan (2013) Operation Crossbow: The Untold Story of Photographic Intelligence and the Search For Hitler's V Weapons, Random House.

References

External links
Official website of the National Collection of Aerial Photography
Official website of Historic Environment Scotland

Photo archives in the United Kingdom
Edinburgh
Archives in Scotland
Year of establishment missing
Aerial photography
Historic Environment Scotland